The Eldorado do Carajás massacre was the mass killing of nineteen landless farmers who were squatting at a private ranch. They were shot by military police on April 17, 1996, in the southern region of the Pará state, Brazil.

On April 17, 1996, 19 members of the Movimento dos Trabalhadores Rurais Sem Terra (Landless Workers Movement) or MST were shot by Pará state military police at the "S" curve of highway PA-150 in Eldorado do Carajás municipality, in southern Pará state. These people were part of a demonstration calling for the federal appropriation of a private ranch where the MST had mounted a camp called "Macaxeira" with almost 3000 families.

On the orders of the state secretary of public security, Paulo Sette Câmara, the police were ordered to clear the highway "at any cost".

Designation as a massacre
The Portuguese word massacre ("chacina", which means the same thing basically) has been used repeatedly and consistently in the Brazilian press to describe the shooting deaths of these farmers. There are well over 100 Brazilian news internet sites which use the exact phrase "chacina de Eldorado de Carajás" to designate these killings.

Aftermath
On May 7, 2012, sixteen years after the event, the two commanders of the Eldorado do Carajas massacre, in which 19 people were killed, were finally jailed.

Remembrance
The President of the Brazilian Chamber of Deputies, Arlindo Chinaglia, gave a speech to remember the horror of the "Massacre de Eldorado de Carajás" in Brasília on 17 April 2008, to mark the 12th year after the massacre. See: "Chinaglia afirma que Massacre de Eldorado do Carajás é o maior contra trabalhadores brasileiros".

References

Amnesty.org Library

See also
1989 Santa Elmira massacre
2017 Santa Lúcia massacre
List of massacres in Brazil
Os 20 anos do massacre de Eldorado do Carajás

April 1996 crimes
1996 murders in Brazil
Mass murder in 1996
Massacres in 1996
1996 mass shootings in South America
Mass shootings in Brazil
Massacres in Brazil
Pará
Crimes committed by law enforcement
Protest-related deaths